The following highways are numbered 589:

Canada
Alberta Highway 589
 Ontario Highway 589

Ireland
 R589 road (Ireland)

United States